Keeping Children and Families Safe Act of 2003 was an American federal legislation (108th Congress (2003-2004)) reauthorizing the Child Abuse Prevention and Treatment Act, the Adoption Opportunities Act, the Abandoned Infants Assistance Act, and the Family Violence Prevention and Services Act. The committee had three general goals for this legislation: (1) to encourage new training and better qualifications for CPS workers; (2) to encourage links between agencies to better improve services for children; and (3) to strengthen initiatives to prevent child abuse and neglect.

S.342 - Keeping Childrens and Families Safe Act of 2003 

The Senate version of the bill contains much of the same language, but there are some significant differences. For example, the House bill requires hospitals to report to child protective services the birth of a fetal alcohol or drug-exposed infant, and referral of the infant for evaluation for developmental disabilities to the State's early intervention program provided by a Part C agency. The Senate version requires referral "as appropriate" for infants affected by illegal substance abuse, but not including fetal alcohol abuse.

See also
 Domestic violence in the United States
 Family Violence Prevention and Services Act
 Violence Against Women Act

References

Acts of the 108th United States Congress
Adoption law
Child support
Family law
Foster care in the United States
United States federal legislation articles without infoboxes
United States federal child welfare legislation